Histone-lysine N-methyltransferase SUV39H1 is an enzyme that in humans is encoded by the SUV39H1 gene.

Function 

This gene is a member of the suppressor of variegation 3-9 homolog family and encodes a protein with a chromodomain and a C-terminal SET domain. This nuclear protein moves to the centromeres during mitosis and functions as a histone methyltransferase, methylating Lys-9 of histone H3. Overall, it plays a vital role in heterochromatin organization, chromosome segregation, and mitotic progression.
In mouse embryonic stem cells, Suv39h1 expression is repressed by OCT4 protein through the induction of an antisense long non-coding RNA.

Interactions 

SUV39H1 has been shown to interact with:

 CBX1,
 CBX5, 
 DNMT3A, 
 HDAC1, 
 HDAC3, 
 HDAC9, 
 Histone deacetylase 2, 
 MBD1, 
 RUNX1, 
 Retinoblastoma protein,  and
 SBF1. 

 PIN1

References

Further reading